Justice for Workers: Decent Work for All (previously Fight for $15 and Fairness) is a Canadian campaign and movement focused on the rights and remuneration of low-wage workers.

History 
The Fight for $15 and Fairness campaign was launched in the spring of 2015, following the Fight for $15 campaign launch in the US in 2012. Initially the campaign focused on the unmet needs of low-wage workers in precarious employment in Ontario. In April 2015, the campaign organized Ontario-wide demonstrations.

After the passing of the Making Ontario Open for Business Act, 2018 reduced the Ontario Government's commitment to minimum wage, protesting continued on a smaller scale. 

During 2020 and 2021, the campaign's activates expanded into Nova Scotia and Newfoundland and Labrador.

In January 2022, the Ontario government raised minimum wage to $15 and in 2022, the campaign rebranded as Justice for Workers and (referencing the increased costs of living) started campaigning for a $20-per-hour minimum wage.

Impact 
The campaign has "terrified"  Restaurant Brands International, the owners of Tim Hortons, and the campaign was credited with the inclusion of a $15 federal minimum wage in the 2021 Canadian federal budget.

References

External links 

 Justice for Workers
 Fight for $15 and Fairness

Labour disputes in Canada
2015 labor disputes and strikes
Labour disputes in Ontario